The 2012 ABN AMRO World Tennis Tournament was a men's tennis tournament played on indoor hard courts. It was the 40th edition of the event known as the ABN AMRO World Tennis Tournament, and was part of the ATP World Tour 500 series of the 2012 ATP World Tour. It took place at the Rotterdam Ahoy indoor sporting arena in Rotterdam, Netherlands, from 13 February through 19 February 2012. First-seeded Roger Federer won the singles title.

The field was led by 16-time Grand Slam champion Roger Federer, 2010 Wimbledon finalist Tomáš Berdych and 2009 US Open champion Juan Martín del Potro.

Singles main draw entrants

Seeds

1 Rankings as of February 6, 2012

Other entrants
The following players received wildcards into the main draw:
  Thiemo de Bakker
  Jesse Huta Galung
  Igor Sijsling

The following players received entry from the qualifying draw:
  Matthias Bachinger
  Karol Beck
  Rik de Voest
  Paul-Henri Mathieu

Withdrawals
  Robin Söderling (mononucleosis)

Retirements
  Marcos Baghdatis (left calf injury)
  Sergiy Stakhovsky (viral illness)
  Mikhail Youzhny (foot injury)

ATP doubles main draw entrants

Seeds

 Rankings are as of February 6, 2012

Other entrants
The following pairs received wildcards into the doubles main draw:
  Thiemo de Bakker /  Robin Haase
  Thomas Schoorel /  Igor Sijsling

Finals

Singles

 Roger Federer defeated  Juan Martín del Potro 6–1, 6–4
It was Federer's 1st title of the year and 71st of his career. It was his 2nd win at Rotterdam, also winning in 2005.

Doubles

 Michaël Llodra /  Nenad Zimonjić defeated  Robert Lindstedt /  Horia Tecău 4–6, 7–5, [16–14]

References

External links
 Official website
 ATP tournament profile
 ITF tournament edition details

 
ABN AMRO World Tennis Tournament
ABN AMRO World Tennis Tournament
ABN AMRO World Tennis Tournament